Ernest Islip (10 October 1892 – August 1941) was an English professional footballer who played as a forward. He played for several years in the First Division of the Football League, and won the FA Cup with Huddersfield Town.

Biography
Islip was born in Parkwood Springs, Sheffield. He began his football career with local club Sheffield Douglas F.C. before turning professional with Second Division Huddersfield Town in 1911. While at Huddersfield he contributed to the club gaining promotion from the Second Division in 1919–20, played in the 1920 FA Cup Final and again in 1922, this time on the winning side. He was the club's leading League scorer in the 1921–22 season.

Islip moved to Birmingham in November 1923 for a fee of £1,500, and in his first full season was joint leading scorer, but the prolific partnership between George Briggs and Joe Bradford left him on the sidelines. He moved on to Bradford City for a fee of £400 in 1927, spending one season there in the Third Division North. He had short spells at Kidderminster Harriers, Ashton National and Wrexham before retiring in 1929. Islip died in Huddersfield at the age of 48.

Honours
Huddersfield Town
 FA Cup winners: 1922
 FA Charity Shield winners: 1922
 FA Cup runners-up: 1920
 Second Division runners-up: 1919–20
 Club leading scorer 1922
Birmingham
 Club leading scorer 1925

References
General

Specific

1892 births
1941 deaths
Footballers from Sheffield
English footballers
Association football forwards
Huddersfield Town A.F.C. players
Birmingham City F.C. players
Bradford City A.F.C. players
Kidderminster Harriers F.C. players
Wrexham A.F.C. players
Ashton National F.C. players
English Football League players
FA Cup Final players